Clayton School may refer to:

Clayton School (Clayton, Iowa), listed on the National Register of Historic Places in Clayton County, Iowa
Clayton School (Clayton, Washington), listed on the National Register of Historic Places in Stevens County, Washington